Keep Left may refer to:

 A type of traffic regulatory sign.
 Driving on the left, see Right- and left-hand traffic.
 "Keep Left" (pamphlet), a 1947 tract published in the UK.
 Keep Left, an early 1960s newspaper published by activists in the Young Socialists (UK).
 Keep Left (South Africa), a South African socialist group.
 Keep Left, a youth group within the Lebanese Democratic Left Movement.

See also 
 Turn Left (disambiguation)